Mnesictena is a genus of snout moths in the subfamily Spilomelinae, where it is placed in the tribe Udeini. The genus was erected by the English entomologist Edward Meyrick in 1884. The currently known seven species are exclusively found on New Zealand and the associated Antipodes Islands and Chatham Islands.

In the past, Mnesictena was included in the genus Udea, but it is currently considered a separate genus.

The caterpillars feed on different plants, with Mnesictena flavidalis being recorded from Muehlenbeckia (Polygonaceae), M. daiclesalis from Veronica macrocarpa (Plantaginaceae), and M. notata as well as M. marmarina from Urtica, the latter also from Australina.

Species

Mnesictena adversa (Philpott, 1917), distributed on New Zealand
Mnesictena antipodea (Salmon in Salmon & Bradley, 1956), distributed on the SE Antipodes Island
Mnesictena daiclesalis (Walker, 1859), distributed on New Zealand
Mnesictena flavidalis (Doubleday, 1843), distributed on New Zealand
Mnesictena marmarina Meyrick, 1884, distributed on New Zealand; type species of the genus
Mnesictena notata (Butler, 1879), distributed on New Zealand
Mnesictena pantheropa (Meyrick, 1884), distributed on the Chatham Islsnds

References

 
Crambidae genera
Spilomelinae
Taxa named by Edward Meyrick